Fresco is an early 1983 EP released by Australian rock/synthpop band, Icehouse. It contains the same versions of "Hey Little Girl" and "Glam" from their 1982 album Primitive Man together with different versions of "Break These Chains", "Street Cafe" and "Over the Line" (B-side of "Street Cafe" single). It was produced by Icehouse founder Iva Davies together with Keith Forsey for Chrysalis Records.

Track listing
All tracks were written by Iva Davies.

A Side
 "Break These Chains" - 3:40
 "Hey Little Girl" - 3:38
 "Over the Line" - 2:45

B Side
 "Street Cafe" - 4:11
 "Glam" - 3:18

Credits

Art
Cover Illustration: Geoffrey Gifford
Cover Design: Gillian Titus

References

1983 debut EPs
Icehouse (band) albums
albums produced by Keith Forsey
Chrysalis Records EPs